Ivica Jurkić (born 22 February 1994) is a Bosnian Croat footballer who currently plays for NK Zelina.

Club career
Jurkić passed through all the youth ranks of his local club NK Troglav 1918 Livno, before moving on to another lower-tier club, NK Kamešnica Podhum in 2014.

He moved to Croatia in 2015, to the top-tier NK Zadar, featuring in 11 matches, 10 in the league and 1 in the cup until the end of the season, which saw his club relegated. He moved on to another Druga HNL team, NK Hrvatski Dragovoljac at the start of the 2015/2016 season, but was soon back in the Prva HNL, having signed a year and a half long contract with NK Istra 1961. A left-back during his entire career, he was moved by coach Andrej Panadić to a more central role, playing as the left centre back.

In August 2019, Jurkić joined NK Zelina. After a spell in 2020 at Austrian club SVH Waldbach and later Slovenian club NK Rogaška, Jurkić returned to Croatia ind March 2021 to join NK Jalžabet.

References

External links
 

1994 births
Living people
Sportspeople from Livno
Association football central defenders
Bosnia and Herzegovina footballers
NK Troglav 1918 Livno players
NK Zadar players
NK Hrvatski Dragovoljac players
NK Istra 1961 players
FK Mladost Doboj Kakanj players
A.S. Bisceglie Calcio 1913 players
NK Zelina players
NK Rogaška players
Croatian Football League players
First Football League (Croatia) players
Serie C players
Bosnia and Herzegovina expatriate footballers
Expatriate footballers in Croatia
Expatriate footballers in Italy
Expatriate footballers in Austria
Expatriate footballers in Slovenia
Bosnia and Herzegovina expatriate sportspeople in Croatia
Bosnia and Herzegovina expatriate sportspeople in Italy
Bosnia and Herzegovina expatriate sportspeople in Austria
Bosnia and Herzegovina expatriate sportspeople in Slovenia